Kalāteh-ye Manşūr (also known as ‘Kalāteh-ye and Kalāteh-ye Shāh Manşūr) is a village in Kakhk Rural District, Kakhk District, Gonabad County, Razavi Khorasan Province, Iran. At the 2006 census, its population was 82, in 24 families.

See also 

 List of cities, towns and villages in Razavi Khorasan Province

References 

Populated places in Gonabad County